Robert Lang (26 October 1886 – 14 November 1941) was an Austrian football player and coach.

As player he played with Vienna Cricket&FC between 1902 and 1909 (the club was renamed to FK Austria Wien in 1926).  While representing Vienna Cricket&FC he played for the city team of Vienna against Leupzig in 1903 and the city team of Berlin in 1905, 1906 and 1907.  He also played in 1921 with Yugoslav side SK Jugoslavija.

He coached 1. Simmeringer SC in the seasons 1924–25, 1925–26 and 1926–27, Wacker Wien in the 1927–28 season, next FK Austria Wien in the seasons 1928–29, 1929–30 and 1930–31. In the season 1938–39 he coached Swiss side FC Luzern. and in the following season, 1939–40, he coached Yugoslav side SK Jugoslavija.

He also managed the Austria national football team in friendly matches during 1926.  Then he replaced Austria coach Hugo Meisl in the 1926 game against Czechoslovakia, and then again in the 1928 games against Czechoslovakia and Yugoslavia.

He also coached Swiss club FC Neumünster Zürich.

References

External links
 Robert Lang at Austria-archive.at

1886 births
1941 deaths
Footballers from Vienna
Austrian footballers
Association football midfielders
FK Austria Wien players
SK Jugoslavija players
Expatriate footballers in Yugoslavia
Austrian football managers
Austria national football team managers
1. Simmeringer SC managers
FC Admira Wacker Mödling managers
FK Austria Wien managers
FC Luzern managers
Expatriate football managers in Switzerland
Austrian expatriate sportspeople in Switzerland
SK Jugoslavija managers
Austrian expatriate sportspeople in Yugoslavia
Expatriate football managers in Yugoslavia